Kirils Medjancevs (born 21 November 1970) is a Latvian modern pentathlete. He competed at the 1992 Summer Olympics.

References

1970 births
Living people
Latvian male modern pentathletes
Olympic modern pentathletes of Latvia
Modern pentathletes at the 1992 Summer Olympics
Sportspeople from Riga